Seeking Thrills is the second studio album by English singer-songwriter Georgia. It was released on 10 January 2020 under Domino Recording Company.

Release and promotion
The first single "Started Out" was released on 1 November 2018. The next single, "About Work the Dancefloor", was released on 28 March 2019. Another single, titled "Never Let You Go", was released on 19 September 2019.

An expanded edition of the album, subtitled "The Ultimate Thrills Edition", was released digitally on 11 December 2020. It added a cover of Kate Bush's "Running Up That Hill", a reworking of "Feel It" featuring Yung Baby Tate, and 25 remixes.

Critical reception
Seeking Thrills was met with generally favourable reviews from critics. At Metacritic, which assigns a weighted average rating out of 100 to reviews from mainstream music critics, the album holds an average score of 78, based on 18 reviews.

The album was shortlisted for the Mercury Prize 2020.

Track listing

Charts

References

2020 albums
Domino Recording Company albums